Chiril River may refer to the following rivers in Romania:

 Chiril River (Bistrița), a tributary of the Bistrița
 Chiril River (Putna), a tributary of the Putna

See also 
 Chiril (disambiguation)
 Chirilovca (disambiguation)
 Chirui River (disambiguation)